This is a list of football games played by the Indonesia national under-23 football team.

Results

2011

 1 Non FIFA 'A' international match

2012

2013

2014

2015

2017

2018

2019

2021

2022

References

Football in Indonesia
Indonesia national football team
National under-23 association football team results